Hugh Thompson Rice Jr. (born August 4, 1957) is an American lawyer and politician who served as the U.S. representative for  from 2013 to 2023. The district serves most of the northeastern corner of the state and includes Myrtle Beach, the Grand Strand, Florence, Cheraw, and Darlington. A Republican, Rice was first elected in 2012 and was a member of the freshman class chosen to sit at the House Republican leadership table. Rice was reelected in 2014, defeating Democratic nominee Gloria Bromell Tinubu in a rematch of the 2012 election.

Rice was one of ten Republicans to vote to impeach Donald Trump in the second impeachment of Donald Trump. In January 2021, the South Carolina Republican Party censured him for voting for the impeachment. In 2022, Trump endorsed a Rice primary opponent for his seat. Rice lost the Republican nomination in the June 14 primary to South Carolina state representative Russell Fry, garnering less than 25% of the vote.

Early life and education
Rice was born in Charleston, South Carolina, on August 4, 1957. He was four years old when his parents divorced, and his mother, a teacher, took him and his brother Clay to Myrtle Beach. Rice's first job was a busboy when he was 12, and he was variously a night shift fry cook, a grocery store bag boy, and miniature golf course manager while still in high school. Rice was 16 when his father died.

Rice was offered a scholarship to Duke University but enrolled at the University of South Carolina, where he earned a bachelor's degree (B.S.) and in 1979, a master's degree in accounting. In 1982, he earned a J.D. degree from the University of South Carolina School of Law.

Early career 
After college, Rice worked at the accounting/consulting firm of Deloitte & Touche in Charlotte, where he earned his CPA certificate. In 1985 he returned to Myrtle Beach to practice tax law with the law firm Van Osdell, then established his own practice, Rice & MacDonald, in 1997. He was elected chair of the Horry County Council in 2010, serving until he resigned from the position on December 31, 2012, in order to take his seat in Congress.

U.S. House of Representatives

Elections

2012 

Rice was elected to the U.S. House in 2012 as the first representative for the newly created 7th district. He defeated Jay Jordan, Randal Wallace, Dick Withington, James Mader, Chad Prosser, Katherine Jenerette, and Renee Culler in the June 12 Republican primary to advance to a runoff. In the June 26 runoff he defeated Andre Bauer. Rice defeated Gloria Bromell Tinubu in the November 6 general election.

2014 

Rice was reelected in 2014, defeating Bromell Tinubu again, with 60.15% of the vote to her 39.85%.

2022

On June 14, 2022, Rice lost the Republican nomination to Russell Fry.

Tenure 
In December 2012, the House appointed Rice to the Committee on Transportation and Infrastructure, the Committee on the Budget and the Committee on Small Business of the 113th Congress.

On January 8, 2013, Congressman Sam Graves appointed Rice chairman of the Subcommittee on Economic Growth, Tax and Capital Access.

On January 22, 2013, Rice was appointed to the following subcommittees: Highways and Transit, Water Resources and Environment, and Coast Guard and Maritime Transportation. He said the appointments would allow him to work for the funding and construction of Interstate 73 as well as the dredging of the Georgetown Port.

On November 11, 2013, Rice was appointed to the water resources conference committee, which helped resolve differences between the House and Senate versions of the Water Resources Reform and Development Act of 2013. The version that passed the House would allow for the dredging of the Georgetown port, a $33 million project that would boost the local economy; Rice said, "I have made it my goal to do whatever it takes to champion South Carolina's ports."

Rice has co-sponsored several pieces of legislation including Safe Schools Act of 2013, a bill to repeal the Patient Protection and Affordable Care Act and health care-related provisions in the Health Care and Education Reconciliation Act of 2010 and others.

Rice has pushed changes to port funding and offered victims help to replace Social Security cards and other federal documents after massive fire destroys 26 condo buildings.

In December 2020, Rice was one of 126 Republican members of the House of Representatives to sign an amicus brief in support of Texas v. Pennsylvania, a lawsuit filed at the United States Supreme Court contesting the results of the 2020 presidential election, in which Joe Biden defeated incumbent Donald Trump. Rice later said he had been mistaken in questioning the election.

On January 13, 2021, Rice was one of ten Republicans who voted to impeach Trump a second time. As late as two days before the impeachment debate, he opposed impeaching Trump. But Rice told The Post and Courier that Trump's response to the storming of the Capitol changed his mind. He criticized Trump for neither offering condolences to those who were injured nor expressing regret about the two police officers who died. In a press release, Rice also upbraided Trump for his lack of contrition. Ultimately, Rice said, Trump's "utter failure" in the matter forced him to vote for impeachment. He did so later that day, alongside nine other Republicans.

On January 30, 2021, the South Carolina Republican Party voted to formally censure Rice for his impeachment vote.

On May 19, 2021, Rice was one of 35 Republicans who joined all Democrats in voting to approve legislation to establish the January 6 commission meant to investigate the storming of the U.S. Capitol.

On February 1, 2022, Trump endorsed state representative Russell Fry in the Republican congressional primary in retaliation for Rice's vote for impeachment. Trump said, "Congressman Tom Rice of South Carolina, the coward who abandoned his constituents by caving to Nancy Pelosi and the Radical Left, and who actually voted against me on Impeachment Hoax #2, must be thrown out of office." In March, after a Trump rally in South Carolina where Fry had spoken, Rice responded, calling Trump "a would-be tyrant, because, like no one else I've ever met, he is consumed by spite." "I took one vote he didn't like and now he's chosen to support a yes man candidate who has and will bow to anything he says." "If you want a Congressman who supports political violence in Ukraine or in the United States Capitol...who supports a would-be tyrant over the Constitution...then Russell Fry is your candidate.”

On June 5, 2022, Rice was interviewed on ABC and asserted that he had "no regrets" about his action. When the interviewer told him that, in his obituary, "the first sentence is going to be 'Tom Rice, who was a Republican member of Congress, voted to impeach Donald Trump'", Rice's reply was, "So be it," he said. "I'll wear it like a badge. So be it."

Rice was interviewed by NBC News on June 13, 2022, and when asked about Trump's actions, he said, "He threw a temper tantrum that culminated with the sacking of the United States Capitol" and "It's a direct attack on the Constitution, and he should be held accountable".

Political positions

Foreign policy and defense 
In June 2021, Rice was one of 49 House Republicans to vote to repeal the Authorization for Use of Military Force Against Iraq Resolution of 2002.

Immigration
Rice voted against the Further Consolidated Appropriations Act of 2020, which authorizes DHS to nearly double the available H-2B visas for the remainder of FY 2020.

LGBT rights
On July 19, 2022, Rice and 46 other Republican Representatives voted for the Respect for Marriage Act, which would codify the right to same-sex marriage in federal law.

Committee assignments 
 Committee on Ways and Means
 Subcommittee on Trade 
 Subcommittee on Select Revenue Measures

Caucus memberships 
 Republican Study Committee
 United States Congressional International Conservation Caucus
 Republican Governance Group
Problem Solvers Caucus

Electoral history

Personal life
Rice and his family live in Myrtle Beach. He married his wife Wrenzie in 1982 and they have three sons.

In late May 2020, Rice announced that he refused to wear a face mask in response to the COVID-19 pandemic in the United States while in Congress; in mid-June, he announced that he, his wife, and his son, had all been infected with COVID-19.

References

External links
 Congressman Tom Rice official U.S. House website
 Tom Rice for Congress
 
 
 

|-

1957 births
21st-century American politicians
American Episcopalians
Episcopalians from South Carolina
Lawyers from Charleston, South Carolina
Living people
Politicians from Charleston, South Carolina
Republican Party members of the South Carolina House of Representatives
Republican Party members of the United States House of Representatives from South Carolina
University of South Carolina School of Law alumni